Elisa Bozzo (born 8 May 1987) is an Italian synchronised swimmer. She competed in the team event at the 2016 Summer Olympics. Bozzo is an athlete of the Gruppo Sportivo della Marina Militare.

References

External links
 

1987 births
Living people
Italian synchronized swimmers
Olympic synchronized swimmers of Italy
Synchronized swimmers at the 2016 Summer Olympics
Sportspeople from Genoa
Artistic swimmers of Marina Militare